Sunrise is the instant at which the upper edge of the Sun appears above the horizon in the east.

Sunrise may also refer to:

Places

Canada 
 Camp Sunrise, a Salvation Army camp near Gibsons in British Columbia
 Sunrise Lake (Vancouver Island), British Columbia

United States

Populated places 
 Sunrise, Alaska, a census-designated place
 Sunrise, Florida, a city
 Sunrise, Long Beach, California, a neighborhood
 Sunrise Township, Chisago County, Minnesota, a township
 Sunrise, Minnesota, an unincorporated community in Sunrise Township
 Sunrise, Virginia, an unincorporated community
 Sunrise, West Virginia, an unincorporated community

Other 
 Sunrise (Charleston, West Virginia), a 1905 historic home
 Sunrise (Gore, Virginia), an 1818 historic home
 Sunrise (Mount Rainier), a visitor center and lodge in Mount Rainier National Park, Washington
 Sunrise, Wyoming, a historic company mining town
 Sunrise Colony, a communal living experiment in Michigan from 1933 to 1936
 Sunrise Glacier (Alaska), a glacier of the Alaska Range
 Sunrise Glacier (Montana), a mountain glacier
 Sunrise Historic District, a community in Washington state
 Sunrise Lake (New Hampshire)
 Sunrise Mountain (Nevada), a peak
 Sunrise Mountain (New Jersey), a peak of the Kittatinny Mountains
 Sunrise River, Minnesota
 Sunrise Theatre, Fort Pierce, Florida
 Sunrise Peak, a mountain in Washington state

People
 Sunrise Adams (born 1982), American pornographic actress

Literature
 Sunrise (play)
 Sunrise (magazine), a journal of the Theosophical Society Pasadena
 Sunrise (novel), a 2009 novel in the Warriors: Power of Three series by Erin Hunter
 Sunrise, a 1937 book by Grace Livingston Hill
 Sunrise, a 1984 novel by Rosie Thomas

Film
 Sunrise (1926 film), an Australian silent film co-directed by Raymond Longford and F. Stuart-Whyte
 Sunrise: A Song of Two Humans, a 1927 American silent film starring Janet Gaynor, directed by F. W. Murnau; often referred to simply as "Sunrise"
 Sunrise (2014 film), a Marathi drama by Partho Sen-Gupta

Radio
 Sunrise Radio Group, a UK radio broadcaster
 Sunrise Radio, an AM station in London
 Sunrise Radio (Yorkshire), an FM station in Bradford
 Sunrise Radio (Ireland), an FM station in Dublin

Television
 Sunrise (Australian TV program), an Australian morning show that premiered on Seven Network in 1991
 Sunrise (New Zealand TV programme), a 2007–2010 New Zealand breakfast news show that aired on TV3
 Sunrise (UK TV programme), a 1989–2019 UK morning show that aired on Sky News 
 "Sunrise" (How I Met Your Mother), a 2014 episode of the TV series How I Met Your Mother
 "Sunrise" (The Twilight Zone), a 2003 episode of the TV series The Twilight Zone (2002–2003)
 Sunrise, the original name for the UK Breakfast Television station GMTV

Music
 Sunrise Records, RCA subsidiary in the 1930s

Classical
 "Sunrise", a nickname for String Quartet, Op. 76, No. 4 by Joseph Haydn
 "Sunrise", the introduction to Also sprach Zarathustra by Richard Strauss
 Sunrise (opera), 2015 opera by Jin Xiang after the 1936 play by Cao Yu

Bands
 Sunrise (band), a German pop band in the late 1970s
 Sunrise (Ukrainian band), a Ukrainian power metal band

Albums
 Sunrise (Day6 album), 2017
 Sunrise (Elvis Presley album), 1999
 Sunrise (Fish Leong album), 2002
 Sunrise (Idoling!!! album), 2010
 Sunrise (Jimmy Ruffin album), 1980
 Sunrise (Paulinho da Costa album), 1984
 Sunrise (Robben Ford album), 1999
 Sunrise (Shelby Lynne album), 1989
 The Sunrise EP, by Cause and Effect, 2003
 Sunrise, by Circle, 2002
 Sunrise, by Eire Apparent, 1969
 Sunrise, by Mick Softley, 1970
 Sunrise, by Sam Feldt, 2017
 Sunrise, half of the Coldplay album Everyday Life, 2019

Songs
 "Sunrise" (Alexandra Joner song), featuring Madcon, 2012
“Sunrise” (Coldplay song), 2019
 "Sunrise" (Caroline song), 2006
 "Sunrise" (The Divine Comedy song), 1998
 "Sunrise" (GFriend song), 2019
 "Sunrise" (Infernal song), 2000
 "Sunrise" (Irene Nelson song), 2010
 "Sunrise" (Joe Bermudez song), 2016
 "Sunrise" (Norah Jones song), 2004
 "Sunrise" (Simply Red song), 2003
 "Sunrise" (Uriah Heep song), 1972, from The Magician's Birthday
 "(Reach Up for The) Sunrise", a 2004 song by Duran Duran
 "Sunrise"/"Sunset (Love Is All)", double A-side single by Ayumi Hamasaki
 "Sunrise/The Trees", double A-side single by Pulp
 "Sunrise", by Childish Gambino from Camp
 "Sunrise", by Eric Carmen from Eric Carmen
 "Sunrise", by The Afters from Live On Forever
 "Sunrise", by Angel City from Love Me Right
 "Sunrise", by The Cataracs
 "Sunrise", by Dannii Minogue from Club Disco
 "Sunrise", by New Order from Low-Life
 "Sunrise", by Puffy AmiYumi from 59
 "Sunrise", by Rascal Flatts from Changed
 "Sunrise", by Scooter from Push the Beat for This Jam (The Second Chapter)
 "Sunrise", by Snoop Dogg from Bible of Love
 "Sunrise", by Spirit from Spirit of '76
 "Sunrise", by Susumu Hirasawa from Detonator Orgun 2
 "Sunrise", by The Who from The Who Sell Out
 "Sunrise", by Yeasayer from All Hour Cymbals
 "Sunrise (Al Amanecer)", from the musical In the Heights

Science
 Sunrise (telescope), a solar telescope
 Sunrise period, period of time after the launch of a new top-level or second-level Internet domain

Transport and Aircraft
 Sunrise station, a Sacramento Regional Transit District light-rail station in Rancho Cordova, California, United States
 AstroFlight Sunrise, an American solar-powered experimental aircraft
 Bautek Sunrise, a German hang glider
Empire Lad, a British Government Empire ship later renamed Sunrise
 Sunrise Airways, a Haitian airline
 Sunrise (Belgium), a Belgian defunct airline

Companies
 Sunrise (company), a Japanese animation company, now known as Bandai Namco Filmworks
 Sunrise UPC, a Swiss telecommunications company
 Sunrise Senior Living, an American retirement-home company
 Sunrise Calendar, a calendar application for mobile and desktop

See also
 
 Sunrise service, a Christian worship service on Easter
 Tequila Sunrise (cocktail), an alcoholic drink
 Operation Sunrise (disambiguation)
 Sunrise Beach (disambiguation)
 Sunrise FM (disambiguation)
 Sunrise Lake (disambiguation)
 Sunrise Movement, a youth environmentalism group
 The Sun Rising (disambiguation)